Robin Ince (born 20 February 1969) is an English comedian, actor and writer, known for presenting the BBC radio show The Infinite Monkey Cage with physicist Brian Cox, and his stand-up comedy career.

Education

After attending York House prep school, near Croxley Green in Hertfordshire, Ince was, from age 13, educated at Cheltenham College, a boarding independent school for boys in the spa town Cheltenham in Gloucestershire, followed by Royal Holloway, University of London, from which he graduated in English and Drama in 1991.

Career

Stand-up comedy
In 1990, Ince first appeared at Greyfriars Kirkhouse at the Edinburgh Festival where Eddie Izzard was running a venue. At the time Ince was performing in a play called 'Shadow Walker' by Trevor Maynard. He had appeared at the Cafe Royal as part of the Edinburgh Fringe show 'Rubbernecker' alongside Stephen Merchant, Jimmy Carr and Ricky Gervais in 2001.

As a friend of Ricky Gervais, Ince opened as a support act for his Politics tour in 2004 and his Fame tour in 2007. He also appears on the DVD and often appears in Gervaise's video podcasts, mainly being bullied, annoyed and attacked by Gervais.

In 2008 Ince had a residency at the Dorchester Arts Centre, trying out new material for his upcoming shows. In late 2008 he released a live stand-up DVD entitled Robin Ince is as Dumb as You, released by Go Faster Stripe. Then between January and April 2009, Ince performed his UK tour Bleeding Heart Liberal, playing 51 dates. Towards the end of 2009 and into 2010, Ince toured his next show entitled Robin Ince vs. the Moral Majority. In 2011 he started on the road again, performing his 'Happiness Through Science' UK show, which continued to add many dates and was extended into 2012.

In April 2015, Ince made a blog post announcing his retirement from stand-up comedy, writing about impostor syndrome, the commercialisation of the comedy scene and a wish to spend more time with his son. He concluded "Let’s see if I can give up stand up for longer than I gave up whisky, or if the addiction is such that I’ll start busking jokes outside the Hayward Gallery by August." He returned to performing comedy a year later.

In September 2016, Ince performed at the Keep Corbyn rally in Brighton in support of Jeremy Corbyn's campaign in the Labour Party leadership election. Ince staged a stand-up tour, Pragmatic Insanity, in September 2017.

Live events
In 2005, Ince began running the Book Club night at The Albany, London, where acts were encouraged to perform turns of new and experimental material. The club got its name from Ince's attempts to read aloud from – and humorously criticise – various second-hand books which the audience and he had brought in for the occasion. The Book Club proved to be so successful that Ince took it on a full UK tour in 2006, the same year he won the Time Out Award for Outstanding Achievement in Comedy. In 2010, Ince published a book entitled Robin Ince's Bad Book Club about his favourite books that he has used for his shows.

Ince has curated Nine Lessons and Carols for Godless People (later renamed as Nine Lessons and Carols for Curious People) since 2008, a Christmas stage show with performances from comedians, musicians and scientists.

Television
Ince started his television career as a comedy writer, working on The 11 O'Clock Show, for which he also performed as an impressionist, including an impersonation of John Peel. He also appeared in The Office as failed interviewee Stuart Foot. Ince has also appeared on clip shows on British television, where he and other comedians appeared as talking heads.

The second Nine Lessons and Carols for Godless People stage show was screened on BBC Four in 2009, billed as Nerdstock: 9 Lessons and Carols for Godless People.

Radio
He co-starred with Mitch Benn and Alfie Joey in the BBC Radio 4 series Mitch Benn's Crimes Against Music.

Ince and physicist Brian Cox present the science series The Infinite Monkey Cage on Radio 4. The programme won a Gold Award in the Best Speech Programme category at the 2011 Sony Radio Awards.

He is a regular contributor on Steve Lamacq's BBC Radio 6 Music programme, appearing weekly as the show's "music profiler".

In the summer of 2022 he presented a two part BBC Radio 4 series "Robin Ince's Reality Tunnel" exploring the internal and external aspects of reality. This was an edited version of a live performance given in Hulme, Manchester in April 2022

Books
Robin Ince's Bad Book Club: One man's quest to uncover the books that taste forgot (Little, Brown Book Group, 2011) 
I'm a Joke and So Are You: Reflections on Humour and Humanity (Atlantic Books, 2018) 
The Importance of Being Interested – Adventures in Scientific Curiosity (Atlantic Books, 2021) 
Bibliomaniac: An Obsessive’s Tour of the Bookshops of Britain (Atlantic Books, 2022)

With Brian Cox and Alexandra Feachem:
The Infinite Monkey Cage - How to Build a Universe, (HarperCollins, 2018)

Podcast and internet

Ince presented the Utter Shambles (previously Show & Tell) podcast for Paramount Comedy with Josie Long, and presented BBC Radio 4 Extra's Serious About Comedy from 2005 until its end in November 2007. Regular panellists in the show included Book Club performers Josie Long, Howard Read and Natalie Haynes, comedy critics Bruce Dessau and Stephen Armstrong, and many others from the British comedy industry. He now presents Book Shambles with Robin and Josie with Josie Long which is funded via Patreon and music podcast Vitriola with comedian Michael Legge.

In 2013, Ince co-created and launched The Incomplete Map of the Cosmic Genome, an online video based science magazine and archive.  Ince acts as host and co-producer on the project.  Contributors have included Brian Cox, Helen Czerski, Stephen Fry, Chris Hadfield and Stewart Lee.

In 2017, Ince co-founded the Cosmic Shambles Network with Trent Burton, an organisation that creates podcasts, documentaries and events "for people with curious minds".

Personal life
Ince is an atheist and supports the Rationalist Association via New Humanist magazine by organising events at the Bloomsbury Theatre and at the Hammersmith Apollo featuring scientists, musicians and comedians. The first of these was Nine Lessons and Carols for Godless People in Christmas 2008, and more recently he has fronted a Night of 400 Billion Stars. Regular contributions come from Josie Long, Chris Addison, Ricky Gervais, Richard Dawkins, Simon Singh and Philip Jeays. In 2009, Ince organised two events with Josie Long, called Darwin's Birthday Spectacular, marking both the scientist's 200th birthday and the 150th anniversary of the publication of his book On the Origin of Species. He was appointed a patron of Humanists UK, and later of Dignity in Dying.

On 15 September 2010, Ince, along with 54 other public figures, signed an open letter published in The Guardian stating their opposition to Pope Benedict XVI's visit to the UK being a state visit.

Awards
 Chortle Awards – Innovation Award (2006)
 Time Out – Outstanding Contribution to Comedy (2006)
 Chortle Awards – Best Compere (2007)
 Sony Radio Awards – Gold Award for Best Speech Programme (2011)
 Ockham Award for Best Skeptic Event/Campaign (2012)
 Honorary Fellow- University College London (2014)
 Honorary Doctor of Science – Royal Holloway, University of London
 Distinguished Supporter of the British Humanist Association

Other appearances
Ince has appeared at several science events, including the line-up of UCL's Bright Club in both 2009 and 2010, and took part in the Cheltenham Science Festival in 2011 and 2014.

He is a supporter of the yearly festival Pestival which showcases science, music and comedy, and a regular attendee of the Latitude Festival.

Ince gave the British Humanist Association 2012 Voltaire Lecture, "The Importance of Being Interested".

Ince was the lead singer in alternative rock combo TheReg from 1992–1994.

Live credits
 2001: Rubbernecker with Ricky Gervais, Stephen Merchant, Jimmy Carr @ Cafe Royal
 2004: The Award Winning Robin Ince – Star of the Office, Series 1. Episode 5 (First Bit) @ Underbelly
 2005: Book Club @ Underbelly, Lowdown at the Albany
 2005: Robin Ince is as Dumb as You @ Pleasance and Edinburgh Fringe 2005
 2005: Ricky Gervais and Guests @ The Dominion Theatre
 2006: Robin Ince Isn't Waving @ The Assembly Rooms and Edinburgh Fringe 2006
 2007: Lion's Den Comedy Club @ The Cross Kings in Kings Cross
 2007: Robin Ince Knew This Would Happen, Edinburgh Fringe
 2008: Crewe Limelight Club's final comedy night
 2008: Comedy Nights @ Dorchester Arts Centre (throughout the year)
 2008: Things I Like About Carl Sagan And Others, Edinburgh Fringe
 2008: Nine Lessons and Carols for Godless People, Christmas Show
 2009: Charity night @ Grovel bar in Manchester
 2009: Bleeding Heart Liberal (UK tour)
 2009: Night of 40 Billion Stars, with Chris Addison and others
 2009: Carl Sagan Is My God, Oh And Richard Feynman Too, Edinburgh Fringe
 2009: Karaoke Circus, Edinburgh Fringe
 2009: Charles Darwin Birthday Spectacular with Josie Long
 2009: The Return of Nine Lessons and Carols for Godless People
 2009/2010: Robin Ince vs. The Moral Majority (UK tour)
 2011: Ince and Legge @ Stand 5 Comedy Club, Edinburgh Fringe
 2011: Uncaged Monkeys Tour with Simon Singh, Brian Cox, Ben Goldacre and Helen Arney
 2011/2012: Happiness through Science (UK tour)
 2013: The Importance of Being Interested (UK tour)
 2016: Gloom Aid (The 100 Club)
 2017: Pragmatic Insanity (UK tour)

TV credits
 1999: Writer, Alistair McGowan's Big Impression (BBC One)
 2000: Writer, Meet Ricky Gervais (Channel 4)
 2001: "Stuart Foot" (interviewee), The Office (BBC Two)
 2003: John Peel, The 11 O'Clock Show (Channel 4)
 2003: Writer/performer, The Pilot Show (Channel 4)
 2003: Writer/performer, The State We're In (BBC Three)
 2004: Writer/performer, Celebdaq (BBC Three)
 2004: Writer, The Late Edition (BBC Four)
 2005: Writer, The Problem With Anne Robinson (BBC Two)
 2006: Panelist/Guest, Mock the Week (BBC Two)
 2006: Stand Up Routine, Edinburgh & Beyond (Paramount Comedy 1)
 2007: Sketch performer, Comedy Cuts (ITV2)
 2008: Comedy Consultant, Skins (Channel 4)
 2009: Panelist/Guest, What the Dickens (Sky Arts)
 2009: Host, Richard & Judy's New Position (Watch)
 2010: Host, Nerdstock: 9 Lessons and Carols for Godless People (BBC Four)

Radio credits
 2002–2004: Writer/performer, The in Crowd (BBC Radio 4)
 2003–2004: Host, Spanking New (BBC Radio 7)
 2003–2006: Writer/performer, The Day the Music Died (BBC Radio 2)
 2003–2006: Writer/performer/Morrissey/John Peel/Satan, Mitch Benn's Crimes Against Music (BBC Radio 4)
 2004: Performer, Think the Unthinkable (BBC Radio 4)
 2004–2008: Performer, The Now Show (BBC Radio 4)
 2005: Writer, Dead Ringers (BBC Radio 4)
 2005: Host, Serious About Comedy (BBC Radio 7)
 2006–2007: Panelist, The Personality Test (BBC Radio 4)
 2008: Panelist, Just a Minute (BBC Radio 4)
 2009: Guest, Geoff Lloyd's Hometime Show (Absolute Radio)
 2009–present: Host, "The Infinite Monkey Cage" (BBC Radio 4)
 2010: Presenter "Schrodinger's Quantum Kittens" (BBC Radio 4)
 2022: Writer/performer, Robin Ince's Reality Tunnel (BBC Radio 4)

Film credits
 2006: Writer, Razzle Dazzle.

DVDs
 Robin Ince is as Dumb as You (2006)
 Nine Lessons and Carols For Godless People (2008)
 Ten Lessons and Carols For Godless People (2011)
 More Nine Lessons and Carols For Godless People (2012)
 Happiness Through Science (2013)
 Robin Ince's Last Ever Show (2015)

References

External links
 
 
 
 Robin Ince profile on suchsmallportions.com
 2011 interview with The Humourdor

1969 births
Living people
Alumni of Royal Holloway, University of London
British secularists
English atheists
English male comedians
English male television actors
English screenwriters
English male screenwriters
English stand-up comedians
People educated at Cheltenham College
20th-century English comedians
21st-century English comedians
English republicans